Dimitrios Ziogas (born 9 November 1981) is a Greek football player who plays as a striker for Pyrasos Nea Anchialos. He holds the record of most goals scored by a footballer in lower Greek football divisions and has been awarded for his feat by the Greek Football Federation.

References

1981 births
Living people
Greek footballers
Niki Volos F.C. players
Anagennisi Karditsa F.C. players
Anagennisi Giannitsa F.C. players
A.O. Nea Ionia F.C. players
Association football forwards
Footballers from Volos